5th Street is a streetcar station, located across the intersection of H Street NE and 5th Street NE. It is located on the H Street/Benning Road Line of the DC Streetcar system.

History 
5th Street station opened to the public as one of the original stations on February 27, 2016.

Station layout
The station consists of two side platforms on either side of H Street.

References

H Street/Benning Road Line
Streetcars in Washington, D.C.
DC Streetcar stops
Electric railways in Washington, D.C.
Street railways in Washington, D.C.
750 V DC railway electrification
Railway stations in the United States opened in 2016
2016 establishments in Washington, D.C.